The Belgian Mauser can describe many Mauser rifles used by the Belgian Armed Forces or produced by the Belgian plant of FN Herstal.
 The Model 1889 rifle and carbine, including Turkish Model 1890, Model 1916 and Model 1899/36 variants, all chambered in 7.65×53mm Mauser
 The Model 1893 and 1894 rifle and carbine, chambered in 7×57mm Mauser, produced for Spain and Brazil while some were used by the Belgian Gendarmerie, the Garde Civique and the Congo Free State
 The Gewehr 98, in 7.92×57mm Mauser, captured from Germany after World War I
 The Model 1935 short rifle, chambered in 7.65 and the Model 35/46 chambered in .30-06 Springfield
 The Model 1924, Model 1930 and Model 1950 short rifle, mostly produced for export but also used in Belgium post-World War II
 The Karabiner 98k, produced in Belgium after 1945
 The Model 30-11 sniper rifle, in 7.62×51mm NATO

References

See also 
 Turkish Mauser

Mauser rifles
Rifles of Belgium